Chora is a town and the capital of Chora District in Uruzgan Province in southern Afghanistan. Chora has a population of about 3,000. It is a rural town with no industry beyond livestock, agriculture, and small merchants.

History
During the War in Afghanistan, the Battle of Chora took place in and around Chora during June 15–19, 2007. The fighting was between International Security Assistance Force and Afghan forces on one side and Taliban forces on the other, for the control of Chora, regarded by the Taliban as a tactical target because it provides ground access from unsecured Gizab district in the north to the provincial capital of Tarinkot. According to some press reports, the fighting was the largest Taliban offensive of 2007 in Afghanistan, and resulted in a Taliban defeat and the death of one American, two Dutch and 16 Afghan soldiers, as well as approximately 58 civilians and 71 Taliban fighters.

References

Populated places in Urozgan Province
Urozgan Province